Peter Brian Hegseth (born June 6, 1980) is an American television host and author.

Hegseth is an Army National Guard officer and former executive director of political advocacy groups Vets For Freedom and Concerned Veterans for America. The latter, a conservative advocacy group funded by the Koch brothers, advocates greater privatization of the Department of Veterans Affairs. He was considered to lead the United States Department of Veterans Affairs in the Trump administration, but in January 2017, David Shulkin was selected instead.

Hegseth has been active in conservative and Republican politics since his days as an undergraduate at Princeton University. In 2016, he emerged as a strong supporter and ally of Donald Trump's presidential candidacy, and served as an occasional advisor to Trump throughout the latter's presidency. He reportedly persuaded Trump to pardon three American soldiers accused or convicted of war crimes related to the shooting of non-combatants in Iraq. Hegseth, who was a platoon leader at Guantanamo Bay during his military service, defended the treatment of inmates detained there.

Early life and education
Hegseth was born on June 6, 1980, in Forest Lake, Minnesota. He attended Forest Lake Area High School and received his Bachelor of Arts at Princeton University in 2003. In 2013, he received a Master of Public Policy from the John F. Kennedy School of Government at Harvard University.

At Princeton, Hegseth was the publisher of The Princeton Tory, a conservative student-run publication.

Military career 
Following graduation from Princeton in 2003, Hegseth joined Bear Stearns as an equity capital markets analyst and was also commissioned as a reserve infantry officer into the U.S. Army National Guard. In 2004 his unit was called to Guantánamo Bay, where he served as an infantry platoon leader with the Minnesota National Guard.  His unit was under the operational control of the 3rd Battalion, 187th Infantry Regiment 101st Airborne Division. He was awarded the Army Commendation Medal. Shortly after returning from Cuba, Hegseth volunteered to serve in Baghdad and Samarra, where he held the position of infantry platoon leader and, later in Samarra, as civil–military operations officer. During his time in Iraq, he was awarded the Bronze Star Medal, Combat Infantryman Badge, and a second Army Commendation Medal.

He returned to active duty in 2012 as a captain. He was deployed to Afghanistan with the Minnesota Army National Guard and acted as a senior counterinsurgency instructor at the Counterinsurgency Training Center in Kabul. Hegseth, a major, currently serves in the Individual Ready Reserve. He has been awarded two Bronze Stars for his service overseas.

Conservative activism and Senate campaign 
Upon return from Iraq, Hegseth worked briefly at the Manhattan Institute for Policy Research. According to his LinkedIn page, Hegseth left the conservative think tank in 2007 to work at Vets For Freedom as executive director. His role included responding to the Federal Election Commission as "treasurer" of the organization. He worked at Vets for Freedom until 2012. The organization advocated a greater troop presence in Iraq and Afghanistan. Hegseth formed the political action committee MN PAC in 2012.

Hegseth was the executive director for Concerned Veterans for America, an advocacy group funded by the Koch brothers. The group advocated greater privatization of the Department of Veterans Affairs (VA). According to his LinkedIn page, he left the group in 2015.

2012 U.S. Senate campaign 

Hegseth ran for the Republican nomination for the U.S. Senate seat in Minnesota in 2012. He withdrew from the race after the May 2012 convention, before the Republican primary election in August, both events in which Kurt Bills won the nomination.

Questioned spending 
While Hegseth was its chief executive, Concerned Veterans for America hired his brother Philip to work for the non-profit and paid him $108,000 according to tax records from 2016 and 2017. Asked about it, Hegseth's lawyer said that Philip, a May 2015 university graduate, was qualified for the media relations job, and noted there is no prohibition against private entities hiring family members.

An APM Reports analysis found that while Hegseth ran the MN PAC political action committee, one third of its $15,000 in funds were spent on Christmas parties for families and friends. Campaign finance laws in Minnesota do not prohibit such spending. Less than half of the PAC's resources was spent on candidates, and as of March 2018, the PAC had closed its account with the state board.

Punditry 
During the 2016 Republican primaries, he initially backed Marco Rubio, then Ted Cruz, and ultimately Donald Trump. in the years since, Hegseth has emerged as a strong Trump supporter. As a Fox News personality, he frequently criticized the media and Democrats. He criticized Special Counsel Robert Mueller's investigation into Russian interference in the 2016 election. Hegseth has appeared on Fox News Channel, as well as on CNN and MSNBC.

Fox News 
Hegseth joined Fox News as a contributor in 2014.

On June 14, 2015, Hegseth accidentally hit a West Point drummer with an axe while filming a live TV segment in honor of Flag Day. According to the drummer, he sustained "only minor injuries." The New York Daily News reported that in a later segment, the drummer was "seen cheerfully speaking on camera as if the accident never took place."

In May 2018, Hegseth mocked The New York Times for ostensibly not covering a story about the capture of five ISIS leaders, referring to the paper as the "failing New York Times" – but The New York Times had already filed a report on the story.

In December 2018, Hegseth co-hosted Fox News Channel's All-American New Year with Fox Business Network's Kennedy, during which a pre-recorded telephone interview between him and President Trump was broadcast.

In May 2019, it was reported that Trump was considering pardoning several US military service members who had been charged with war crimes, including a veteran set to stand trial for shooting indiscriminately at civilians, hitting a girl and an elderly man, as well as fatally stabbing a captured teenage Islamic State (ISIS) member while he was receiving medical treatment. The Daily Beast and CNN later reported that Hegseth had for months sought to convince Trump to pardon these individuals. At the same time, Hegseth was discussing these cases on Fox News without disclosing that he had advised Trump to pardon them. In November 2019, Trump pardoned three service members accused or convicted of war crimes. Shortly before Trump announced his decision, Hegseth suggested that Trump was about to take "imminent action" in the cases.

In July 2019, Hegseth said that one of the Muslim members of Congress, Rashida Tlaib, had a "Hamas agenda".

In August 2019, he lamented that "young kids voting" are worried about the adverse effects of climate change. Hegseth also criticized universities for teaching students about "environmentalism and radical environmentalism" rather than a "real threat" such as Islamic extremism.

In January 2020, Hegseth expressed strong support for President Trump's decision to kill Iranian General Qasem Soleimani. He also called on Trump to bomb the Iranian homeland, including cultural sites in Iran if they were storing weapons.

In February 2020, amid the spread of the COVID-19 pandemic in the United States, Hegseth said that Democrats were "rooting for coronavirus to spread. They're rooting for it to grow. They're rooting for the problem to get worse."

He has been a regular guest on Unfiltered with Dan Bongino since 2021.

Hegseth suggested the Omicron variant of COVID-19 was made up by Democrats to help them in the 2022 midterm elections, saying "Count on a variant about every October, every two years."

In June 2022 on a "Fox & Friends Weekend" segment Hegseth crossed out Harvard on his Diploma writing in "Critical Theory" and then marked "RETURN TO SENDER" across the central body as a protest of Harvard and other such universities. "People will say ‘this is just a stunt, you still have a degree’ and that's fine. I went, I got the degree, I walked to the classes and all that, but I hope this is a statement that as conservatives and patriots, if we love this country, we can't keep sending our kids and elevating them to universities that are poisoning their minds (against America) I may have survived it, but a lot of kids go there and buy into ‘critical theory university,' and that's how we get future leaders, Supreme Court Justices, Senators, others, who see America as an evil place. And Harvard is a factory for that kind of thinking" he said. Hegseth then declared his intention to return the diploma to Harvard.

Personal life 
Hegseth and his first wife, Meredith Schwarz, divorced in 2009. He married his second wife, Samantha Deering, in 2010; they have three children. In August 2017, while still married to Deering, Hegseth had a daughter with Fox executive producer Jennifer Rauchet, with whom he was having an extramarital relationship. He and Deering divorced in August 2017. Hegseth and Rauchet, who has three young children from her first marriage, married in August 2019.

Hegseth identifies as a Christian.

Books
Hegseth wrote the foreword to the 2017 book The Case Against the Establishment by Nick Adams and Dave Erickson. His own books include:

 
 
 Hegseth, Pete (2022). Battle for the American Mind: Uprooting a Century of Miseducation. Broadside Books. ISBN 978-0-06-321504-7.

Awards, decorations, and badges

See also
 New Yorkers in journalism

References

External links

 Hegseth at the Princeton Tory
 

1980 births
Civil affairs of the United States military
Harvard Kennedy School alumni
Living people
Minnesota Republicans
People from Forest Lake, Minnesota
Princeton University alumni
United States Army officers
United States Army personnel of the Iraq War
United States Army reservists
Fox News people
United States Army personnel of the War in Afghanistan (2001–2021)